The Statue of Hans Christian Andersen in Rosenborg Castle Gardens, Copenhagen, Denmark, is a bronze statue of the Danish writer Hans Christian Andersen.

Description
Saabye's sculpture depicts Andersen in a sitting position addressing his audience. The sculpture is mounted on a terracotta plinth with bronze reliefs.

History

In December 1874, it was first proposed to create a Hans Christian Andersen monument in Copenhagen to mark the writer's 70 years birthday on 2 April 1875. A committee was set up and it was announced that the monument would be placed in Rosenborg Garden on his 70-years birthday. It was decided to launch a design competition. 10 artists submitted a total of 16 proposals in the competition. August Saabye, Theobald Stein, Otto Evens and Lauritz Prior went on to the second and final round of the competition. The other artists that participated in the competition were Louis Hasselriis, Cathinka Jenny Helene Kondrup, Peter Petersen, Christian Deichmann, Thielemann, Chr. Freund and Secher Malthe.

The committee later ultimately selected Saabye's proposal as the winner. The monument was unveiled on 26 June 1880.

See also
 Danish sculpture

References

External links
 Article from Illustreret Tidende

1880 sculptures
1880 establishments in Denmark
Andersen
Bronze sculptures in Copenhagen
Cultural depictions of Hans Christian Andersen
Statues of writers
Statues of men in Copenhagen
Andersen, Hans Christian
Sculptures by August Saabye